Roisin Thomas (born 17 April 1989) is an Irish UCI licensed racing cyclist. In 2019, she won the U.A.E Tour Amateur Green Jersey. In 2018, she won the UAE Amateur Cycling Championships. In 2017, she won the Chaing Mai Yellow Jersey Amateur level with her team Al Asayl as Team Captain. In 2016, she cycled through all seven Emirates of the United Arab Emirates, becoming the first woman to do so.

See also
 List of 2018 UCI Women's Teams and riders

References

1989 births
Living people
Irish female cyclists
Place of birth missing (living people)